Lamb:  The Gospel According to Biff, Christ's Childhood Pal is a novel by American writer Christopher Moore, published in 2002. In this work the author seeks to fill in the "lost" years of Jesus through the eyes of Jesus' childhood pal, "Levi bar Alphaeus who is called Biff".

The original edition of Lamb was issued in hardback and paperback and contains an afterword by the author explaining some background of the novel.  In 2007 a special gift edition was published, with a second afterword by Moore, recollecting his trip to Israel for research.

According to the author, the producer-director Peter Douglas (with Vincent Pictures) optioned the film rights to the novel.

Plot summary
Biff is resurrected in the 20th century to complete missing parts of the Bible, under the inefficient supervision of Raziel; wherefore Biff narrates that he and Joshua (by Biff's account, the Hebrew original of the Hellenized "Jesus") travel Eastward to consult the Three Wise Men (a magician, a Buddhist and a Hindu yogi) who attended Joshua's birth, so that Joshua may learn how to become the Messiah. Over twenty years, Joshua surpasses the trio by incorporating his beliefs into theirs: he learns to multiply food from a Wise Man and learns to become invisible from another, whereas his ability to resurrect the dead, initiates his first meeting with Biff in childhood. Throughout his role, Biff is sarcastic, practical and loyal, against Joshua's temperamental and sometimes idealistic character.

The recounting of Jesus' human and godlike qualities, combined with Biff's earthy debauchery, humorously explains the origins of judo and cappuccino; reasons that Jews eat Chinese food on Christmas; and how rabbits became associated with Easter. The Three Wise Men, Mary Magdalene, Joseph, and Mary all appear as well: Mary Magdalene (here nicknamed "Maggie") is depicted as harboring love for Joshua, while Joshua remains celibate, and Biff compensates by an active sexuality of his own.

At the novel's conclusion, Biff gives "The Gospel According to Biff" to Raziel and discovers a resurrected Maggie exiting the room opposite his, having finished her own Gospel weeks before. At Raziel's behest, they are united immediately.

Literary allusions
The author cited Bulgakov's novel The Master and Margarita—particularly the Biblical scenes told from Pontius Pilate's point of view—as a partial inspiration to create this novel. Other works apparent in the novel are the writings of Lao Tzu, the Kama Sutra, the Torah, the Upanishads, the Bhagavad Gita, Sun Tzu's The Art of War, the Tao Te Ching, and the Gospels of the New Testament.  The idea that prior to his public ministry, Jesus traveled to Kashmir, India, to study at a Tibetan monastery was first suggested by Nicolas Notovitch, in his 1894 hoax The Unknown Life of Jesus Christ.

Relation to Moore's other novels
The bumbling Raziel from this novel later is the title character in Moore's The Stupidest Angel.
Catch, the demon from Moore's debut novel Practical Demonkeeping, makes an appearance in Lamb as the servant of Balthasar, one of the Wise Men.
Jesus himself made a brief cameo in Moore's earlier novel Island of the Sequined Love Nun.

Sequel

In 2015, Moore said of writing a sequel to Lamb, "...I am bound and determined not to do it. At every book signing, somebody will tell me it’s his favorite book. Then they say, 'Can’t you write another?' But if I write a sequel, let me predict what readers will say. They’ll say, ‘Well, it was good, but not as good as Lamb.’ Why would I want to try to outdo Lamb and then fail and ruin it for everyone? Better just to leave it alone."

References

External links

Author's
The author's webpage for Lamb
"Author essay" about the genesis of the novel
Afterword from the novel, "Teaching Yoga to an Elephant"

2002 American novels
American comedy novels
Absurdist fiction
Novels by Christopher Moore
Novelistic portrayals of Jesus
Cultural depictions of Mary, mother of Jesus
2002 fantasy novels
Novels set in ancient Israel
William Morrow and Company books
Cultural depictions of the Biblical Magi
Yeti in fiction
Novels set in Afghanistan
Novels set in Tibet
Novels set in India